John Nicholas Wood FRS is a British neurobiologist, and Head of the Molecular Nociception Group, at University College London.

Life
He earned a Ph.D. in virology at the University of Warwick in 1975.
He studied with Luc Montagnier at the Pasteur Institute from 1976 to 1979. 
He worked at St George's, University of London, with Brian Anderton and Tom Jessell.

He worked at the Wellcome Foundation, and later at the Sandoz Institute (now Novartis). In 2002, he co-founded Ionix pharmaceuticals.

See also
Prof. Anthony Dickenson

References

Living people
British neuroscientists
Fellows of the Royal Society
Academics of University College London
Alumni of the University of Warwick
Year of birth missing (living people)